Events from the year 1626 in art.

Events
Orazio Gentileschi leaves France to work for Charles I of England, where he remains for the rest of his life.

Works

Valentin de Boulogne – Musicians and Soldiers (approximate date)
Orazio Gentileschi – The Lute Player (approximate date)
Frans Hals – Portrait of Isaak Abrahamsz. Massa
Michiel Jansz. van Mierevelt – George Villiers, 1st Duke of Buckingham
Rembrandt
The Angel and the Prophet Balaam
Consul Cerialis and the Germanic Legions
A Musical Gathering
The Rest on the Flight to Egypt (etching)
Tobit and Anna with the Kid
Peter Paul Rubens
Assumption of the Virgin Mary
Christ Appointing Saint Roch as Patron Saint of Plague Victims (altarpiece, completed)
Diego Velázquez – Portrait of the Infante Don Carlos

Births
January - Lucas Achtschellinck, Flemish landscape painter (died 1699)
September 27 – Karel Dujardin, Dutch animal and landscape painter (died 1678)
November 30 – Cesare Pronti, Italian painter of quadratura and allegorical figures (died 1708)
date unknown
Federico Agnelli,  Italian engraver and printer, active in Milan (died 1702)
Alessandro Badiale, Italian painter and engraver (died 1671)
Pieter Boel, Flemish painter (died 1674)
Jan van de Cappelle, Dutch Golden Age painter of seascapes and winter landscapes (died 1679)
Andrea Carlone, Italian painter (died 1697)
Carlo Cesio, Italian painter active in Rome (died 1686)
Lorenzo Tinti, Italian painter and engraver (died 1672)
Simon Ushakov, Russian graphic artist (died 1686)
probable
Bada Shanren (also known as Zhou Da), Chinese calligrapher and painter of shuimohua (died 1705)
Francis Barlow, English painter, etcher, and illustrator (died 1704)
Pierre Prieur, French enamel painter (died 1676)
Jan Steen, Dutch genre painter of the Dutch Golden Age) (died 1679)

Deaths
February 21 – Cardinal Odoardo Farnese, patron of the arts (born 1573)
February 23 – Enea Salmeggia, Italian painter from Bergamo (born 1556)
April – Antiveduto Grammatica, proto-Baroque Italian painter nicknamed Antiveduto ("foreseen") (born 1571)
September 8 – Juan Sánchez Cotán, Spanish painter (born 1560)
September 9 – Abraham Govaerts, Flemish painter of cabinet works
date unknown
Agustín del Castillo, Spanish painter (born 1565)
Anastasio Fontebuoni, Italian painter (born 1571)
Pier Francesco Mazzucchelli, Italian painter of frescoes and altarpieces (born 1573)
Giovanni Niccolo, Italian Jesuit painter (born 1560)
Cristoforo Roncalli, Italian painter (born 1552)
Sebastian Sebastiani, Italian sculptor and founder (born unknown)
Adriaen de Vries, Dutch sculptor (born 1556)
probable – Denis van Alsloot, Flemish painter (born 1570)

 
Years of the 17th century in art
1620s in art